Mauricio Fernández Garza (born April 2, 1950 in Monterrey) is a Mexican politician and businessman directly related to the Fernández Ruiloba wealthy and prominent family; owners of PYOSA (Pigmentos Y Oxidos SA). He was the mayor of San Pedro Garza García, former senator and current member of the board of Grupo Alfa, a Monterrey-based chemical, food and auto-parts producer. He is well known for his art contribution to Nuevo León.

Fernández Garza graduated with a bachelor's degree in Industrial Engineering from Purdue University (U.S.), specialized in economics at the Autonomous University of Nuevo León and received a master's degree in business administration from the Monterrey Institute of Technology and Higher Studies.

He is the founder and president of Comercializadora de Puros, Uniser (Havana, Cuba), Artesanarte and the Museo del Ojo in García, Nuevo León. In June 2005 he sold one of his companies, Especialidades Cerveceras, S.A. (the makers of premium beer Casta) to Fomento Económico Mexicano (FEMSA), world's second-largest Coca-Cola bottler. 

Fernández ran for governor of Nuevo León in 2003. He defeated former treasurer Fernando Elizondo in the National Action Party state primaries (56.5% vs. 20.8%) but lost the gubernatorial election against the candidate of the Institutional Revolutionary Party, Natividad González Parás.

He ran for mayor of San Pedro Garza Garcia in 2009 and won the election. His administration began on October 31 of 2009. His successor to the mayorship of San Pedro Garza García will be independent candidate Miguel Treviño.

Public Safety
During his campaign, Mauricio focused on promoting his anti-crime policies, as the growing crime wave was of concern for many citizens of San Pedro, the wealthiest municipality/city in Mexico. During his campaign, he stated that the city was controlled by the Beltran Leyva drug cartel - these statements caused much controversy. He also mentioned that the relative peace seen in the city was due to Beltran family members living in the city, and their pacts with other cartels to keep San Pedro a "safe zone".

During his commencement speech, he mentioned that the man who issued him a death threat had been killed in Mexico City. This was done before the body was found by the authorities.

One of his main strategies against the rising crime rate was the implementation of an "intelligence" body, which operated in secrecy and was financed by the city's wealthy businessmen. The mayor himself called the group "El Grupo Rudo," which translated from Spanish to "The Rough Group." This group created much controversy, as many thought this group operated illegally. The leader of this group was accused of torture by one of Mauricio's bodyguards, and was later killed by a member of an organized group. The son of the ex-governor Alfonso Martinez Dominguez, Fransico Martinez Cardenas, was in charge of collecting the money from the businessmen. The group was soon disintegrated, however many claim it still operates covertly.

In an effort to reduce the increase in kidnappings and delinquency, he formalized a database that kept track of all domestic servant employees. The goal was to keep track of all of these employees, which number the thousands and work in the wealthy family's homes. One of the arguments in favor of such a database was that many of the kidnappings and robberies occurred because of tips given by the employees. Many human right groups rose in protest.

See also
PYOSA

References

1950 births
Living people
Mexican company founders
Members of the Senate of the Republic (Mexico)
Municipal presidents in Nuevo León
National Action Party (Mexico) politicians
Businesspeople from Monterrey
Politicians from Monterrey
Purdue University College of Engineering alumni
Monterrey Institute of Technology and Higher Education alumni
Autonomous University of Nuevo León alumni
20th-century Mexican politicians
21st-century Mexican politicians